Artaxias I (from ; in ) was the founder of the Artaxiad dynasty of Armenia, ruling from 189 BC to 160 BC. Artaxias was a member of a branch of the Orontid dynasty, the earlier ruling dynasty of Armenia. He expanded his kingdom on all sides, consolidating the territory of Greater Armenia. He enacted a number of administrative reforms to order his expanded realm. He also founded a new capital in the central valley of the Araxes River called Artaxata (Artashat), which quickly grew into a major urban and commercial center. He was succeeded by his son Artavasdes I.

Name 
The Greek form Artaxias ultimately derives from the Old Iranian name *Artaxšaθra-, which is also the source of Greek Artaxérxēs. The name can be translated as "he whose reign is through truth (asha)."

Early Life 
According to Movses Khorenatsi, Artaxias was taken by his wet nurse to Her, to escape persecution from Orontes IV, who most likely viewed him as a challenger to the throne. After arriving at Her, the wet nurse informed Artaxias's tutor, Smbat Bagratuni, of the situation. Upon receiving the message, Smbat left his daughters in the fortress of Bayberd, gathered some of his men and left for Her. When Orontes received news of Smbat's departure, he sent scouts after him, which only delayed Smbat's arrival. When Smbat arrived, he and Artaxias crossed into Seleucid borders. Khorenatsi's account does not give any details regarding the whereabouts of Artaxias's father, Zariadres, or his brother, Mithrobouzanes. Zariadres was most likely ruling over Sophene, which was under Seleucid Dominion.

Life in Exile 

According to the Greek geographer Strabo, Artaxias and Zariadres were Macedonian generals of the Seleucid king Antiochus III the Great. While Zariadres ruled over the Kingdom of Sophene, Artaxias was responsible for the Armenia Strategia. However, Strabo's assertion about the two kings' Macedonian origins has been disproved by the discovery of boundary stones with Aramaic engravings in Armenia, in which Artaxias proclaims himself to be an "Orontid king" and "the son of Zareh (Zariadres)." This demonstrates that Artaxias and Zariadres were most likely members of the Orontid dynasty, albeit probably belonging to collateral branches.

The escape of Artaxias placed plenty of stress on Orontes, who feared that he would return and dethrone him. He sent messengers and offerings to Antiochus III to give up Artaxias. Claiming that he was just a random Median child that Smbat picked up from a family of shepherds."Why do you, my own blood and family, nourish the Mede Artashes in opposition to me and my kingdom, hearkening to the words of the brigand Smbat who claims that Artashes is the son of Sanatruk, and who tries to make the son of shepherds and herdsmen an Arsacid and puts him out to be your blood and kin? He is not the son of Sanatruk, but Smbat deceitfully found some Median child and is making a mockery."Orontes also sent letters to Smbat, telling him that he was deceived by the wet nurse and to end his efforts in placing Artaxias on the throne."Why do you put yourself to so much futile trouble? You have been deceived by that wet nurse, and you are bringing up the son of a Mede in opposition to me."Smbat responded in an unpleasant letter, which led to Orontes killing the guards in Bayberd and imprisoning his daughters at Ani.

Establishment of the Kingdom of Armenia 
After the defeat of Antiochus III the Great at the hands of the Romans, in 188 BC, both Artaxias and Zariadres established themselves as Kings, with Artaxias ruling over the former lands of the Armenia Strategia, while Zariadres continues his rule over Sophene.

War with Orontes IV 
Seeking to unite the Armenian highlands, Artaxias and Zariadres gathered their armies and met up at the center of the Araxes. Artaxias, with the aid of Smbat, would expand eastwards towards Syunik and Vaspurakan, while Zariadres would expand westwards, towards Acilisene and Taron. Orontes was in the province of Utik when he heard the news of Artaxias' arrival, and left immediately, leaving the princes of the region to guard.

Upon arriving at Yervandashat, Orontes gathered troops from Armenia, Mesopotamia, and Iberia. Within this army was Argam, who was the head of the Muratsean family, who had his second rank restored by Orontes after having it taken away and given to his brother-in-law, Mithridates.

The morale in Utik was low, as Artaxias' army arrived, most of the princes surrendered. Artaxias recruited additional Albanian men into his army and advanced from the edge of Lake Sevan to the base of Mt. Aragats towards Orontes's camp, which lied 300 stadia north of Yervandashat on the Akhurean River. Weary about Argam's army of lancers, Artaxias treaded carefully. He sent Argam a message, promising him that he would keep what he already has and double it if he was to abandon Orontes and join Artaxias.

Battle of Yervandavan 

As Artaxias and Orontes' armies confronted each other, Argam ordered his infantry to march off to the side and join Artaxias. This prompted Orontes' left and right wings to desert as well. The Iberian mercenaries, who advanced to assault, also fled to Artaxias' side. When both lines clashed together, two horsemen attacked Artaxias, but was defended by Gisak Dimaksean, the son of Artaxias's wet nurse, who killed them both on foot but died having his face cut in half. The battle resulted in victory for Artaxias, forcing Orontes to flee to Yervandashat. Smbat, on the orders of Artaxias, pursued after him, while the rest of Artaxias's army encamped at Orontes's former camp, which Artaxias named Yervandavan.

When morning came, Artaxias ordered that the dead be buried and set out for Yervandashat. He would meet up with Smbat's forces at the gates of the city and commanded his army to shout "Mar amat," meaning "The Mede has come." Referencing Orontes's insults in his letters towards Artaxias by calling him a Mede. Which would culminate to the renaming of the city to Marmet.

Siege of Yervandashat 
When Artaxias' soldiers attacked the city, the garrison of the fortress surrendered and opened the gate. However, before Artaxias was able to confront Orontes, one of his soldiers struck him with the head of a saber, killing him instantly. Since Orontes belonged to the Orontid dynasty, his corpse was buried with the funerary columns under the orders of Artaxias.

Following the death of Orontes, Artaxias ordered Smbat to execute Orontes' brother, Mithras (Armenian: Երուազ; romanized: Yeruaz), who was appointed by Orontes as the Krmapet. Smbat marched his army to Bagaran, captured him, hung a millstone around his neck, and threw him into the Akhurean River.

Rewarding his Benefactors 

After the end of the civil war, Artaxias rewarded his army for their participation. He preserved Argam's role as second rank and gave him a crown decorated with rubies and sapphires, earrings, the right to use a golden fork and spoon and to drink from golden goblets, and one red slipper for his right foot. Smbat would get the same rewards as Argam minus the red slipper and the two earrings, but entrusted him with the entire Armenian army, governors of the land, and over all royal households. Smbat was also allowed to keep the slaves that he captured from Bagaran, however he would found a town with the same name behind Mt. Masis, and settle them there. Artaxias would raise the rank of Nerses Dimaksean, son of Gisak Dimaksean and grandson of Artaxias's wet nurse, to aspet. After the execution of Mithras, Artaxias gave the rank of Krmapet (Chief Preist) to a trusted dream interpreter named Mogpashte. Finally, Zariadres would continue to rule over his kingdom in Sophene.

Iberian Invasion 
Following the overthrow of Orontes, the kings of Iberia, Armazel and Azork, began planning an invasion of Armenia. They managed to discreetly gather support from the Jeks and Pechengs, as well as the king of the Leks, who brought Durdzuks and Didoians. When the attack commenced, the joint Ibero-Leki army managed to ravage a large part of the Ayrarat province, including the regions of Shirakan, Vanand, Bagrevand, Basen, and even down to Nakhchavan. The Iberian forces were on the road to Parisos when Artaxias managed to raise an army that could counter them. Smbat was sent to counter the North Caucasian armies, which at that point were camped on the banks of the Lori river in Kambechovani.

Smbat offered them an ultimatum; they may keep the spoils they have gained, but must return the prisoners. The North Caucasian kings refused, saying that they got what they came for, and challenged Smbat to a duel, and threatened him that they would come for him. Thus, Smbat crossed the Mtkvari with his army, and arrived at their camp.

As Smbat arrived, the king of the Alans, Bazuk, came out and challenged him to a duel. As Smbat came out on his horse, and armed with a spear, Bazuk charged at him. However Smbat struck Bazuk on the spear and threw him off his horse. Anbazuk, the brother of Bazuk, rushed to aid his brother, but Smbat speared him too, threw him off his horse and said, “This is for the Armenian women, men and children you have killed.”In shock, the North Caucasian Armies rallied with the Iberian kings Armazel and Azork and charged at the Armenian army. Heavy fighting would persist for seven hours until the Armenian army achieved victory. The North Caucasians fled, however Smbat pursued them and defeated the Ossetians and the Leks, while the Iberians, being more familiar with the landscape, managed to flee without sustaining additional losses.

Smbat led the Armenian army into the region of Kartli and devastated it. He founded the fortress of Demotistsikhe and left a garrison in the region before he returned to Armenia. However the kings of Iberia regrouped and continued skirmishing with the garrison, they were also aided by the Alans, who seeked revenge for the death of their king. Fighting also broke out at the Armeno-Iberian border at Tayk.

Thus, King Artaxias, along with Smbat, brought his army to Mtskheta and initiated a siege that lasted for 5 months. However in the end, the joint Iberian-Alanian forces began to face problems and appealed for peace. King Artaxias heeded their request and vassalized Iberia and Alania.

Reign 

After gaining their independence from the Seleucids, Artaxias and Zariadres, who may have been close relatives, allied with each other to expand their dominions. The kingdom of Artaxias, originally centered around the Araxes valley, expanded into the territory of Media Atropatene, which lost its territories bordering the Caspian Sea. The Kura River became the northern and northeastern border of Armenia. Strabo reports that Artaxias also conquered from Atropatene the districts of "Phaunitis" and "Basoporeda," perhaps corresponding to Siwnikʿ and Vaspurakan, respectively. Meanwhile, Zariadres conquered Acilisene and Taron. According to Strabo, the unification of these territories under Artaxias and Zariadres led the population of Greater Armenia and Sophene to "speak the same language," i.e., Armenian. However, the imperial Aramaic inherited from the Achaemenid Empire continued to be the language of the government and the court. Like the monarchs of Pontus and Cappadocia, Artaxias and his successors preserved the royal traditions used by the former Achaemenid Empire. At the same time, Greek influence was starting to advance in the country. Eventually, Aramaic would be phased out and replaced with Greek as the court language. 

According to the Armenian historian Movses Khorenatsi, Artaxias ordered the delimitation of villages and farmland, which has been confirmed by the discovery of boundary stones with Aramaic inscriptions in Armenia. Over a dozen of these boundary stones have been found.

Founding of Artaxata 

Artaxias founded the city of Artaxiasata (Armenian: Artashashat, from Middle Persian Artaxšas-šāt, "the joy of Artaxias," abbreviated to Artaxata in Greek and Artashat in Armenian) on the left bank of the Araxes River, which would serve as the capital of Armenia until the 2nd century CE. Khorenatsi writes about the former Carthaginian commander Hannibal taking refuge at the Armenian court and playing a role in the establishment of the city, but this is most likely a myth. Despite this, Strabo and Pliny nicknamed the city as "Armenian Carthage".

Artaxias resettled residents from Yervandashat and Armavir to Artaxata and transferred the idols of Tir, Anahit, and various other statues from Bagaran. The statue of Tir would be placed outside the city near the roads. The result of these policies led to the quick development of Artaxata, which became an important administrative, trade, cultural, and religious center. Artaxias also founded the city of Arxata, which was mentioned by Strabo, as well as the cities of Zarehavan and Zarishat, which were both named after his father, Zariadres.

Conflict with the Alans 

Khorenatsi and Kaghankatvatsi write about an Alanian incursion occurring at the Northern borders of Armenia. The Alans, having conquered the lands of Iberia, moved further southwards into Armenia. Artaxias gathered a large amount of troops and marched north to push the Alans back. After a fierce battle occurring between them, which resulted in the capture of the Alanian king's son, thus forcing the Alans to retreat north behind the Kura river, and set camp. Artaxias would further pursue them up north and set up camp south of the Kura river. The Alanian king asked for an eternal peace between the Armenians and the Alans, promising to give anything Artaxias wanted so long as he would release his son. However Artaxias refused to do so.

One day, Satenik, the king's daughter, came to the shore of the Kura river with an interpreter and begged Artaxias to release his brother.

Upon hearing the voice of Satenik, Artaxias traveled down the river to see her, and was immediately captivated by her beauty. Artaxias called on Smbat and confessed his desire for Satenik, and was willing to make peace with the Alans. Smbat dispatched a messenger to the Alanian king, who asked when Satenik should be brought. However Artaxias sought to abduct Satenik instead, as it was viewed more honorable during this period than formal acquiescence.

Artaxias mounted his horse and rode to the Alanian camp, where he lassos Satenik with his red leather and gold studded rope, and brought her back to the Armenian camp.

Marriage and Family 

Following Satenik's abduction, Artaxias agreed to pay the Alans vast amounts of gold and red leather, the latter of which was highly valued material among the Alans. With this, the two kings would conclude their peace treaty and a lavish wedding took place. Artaxias would go on to have five sons and would assign them various positions in the kingdom as they reached maturity:

Artavasdes, being the oldest, was the prime inheritor of the throne. He was responsible for governing the eastern regions of the kingdom and was assigned to Sparapet. Khorenatsi described Artavasdes as a brave, but jealous, cruel, selfish, and power hungry man.

Vruyr, the second oldest and wisest, was given responsibility over managing taxation, infrastructure, and all affairs in the court and was given the title hazarapet.

Mazhan, the third oldest, held a position in the army, but was later made Krmapet (chief priest) of the god Aramazd in Ani.

Tigranes, the fourth oldest, was entrusted with the western half of the Armenian army.

Zariadres, the fifth oldest, was entrusted with the Northern half of the army. He was described by Khorenatsi as a boastful man who was an expert huntsman, but was incompetent at warfare.

However, unbeknownst to Artaxias, Satenik would fall in love with a man named Argavan who was a descendant of the Vishaps, which Khorenatsi associates to Argam Muratsean.

Conflict with Argam Muratsean 
Despite Artaxias unaware about Satenik's affair with Argam, Artavasdes finds out and convinces Artaxias that Argam was plotting against him and planned to take over the kingdom. Artaxias would strip Argam of his second rank and transfer it to Artavasdes. After this, Artaxias and Artavasdes went to Argam's banquet, and on the pretext of a suspicion that a plot was planned against the king, Artavasdes started a fight with Argam.

During the confusion, Artaxias returned to Artaxata and sent Mazhan to slaughter the Muratseans and burn down Argam's palace. Two years later, Artaxias ordered Argam to give up his possessions, with the exception of his concubine. However Artavasdes was not satisfied with depriving Argam of his second rank, thus he seized the city of Naxuana, all the villages belonging to the Muratseans, and appropriated their palaces and fortresses for his own inheritance. Unable to bear this, one of Argam's sons instigated a revolt, but was put down by Artavasdes, which resulted in a massacre of all able bodied men and confiscation of their villages. Those who survived escaped to Artaxata and gained refuge at the court.

Death of Zariadres and Conflict over Sophene 
In 188 BC, Zariadres would die, leaving the throne ofSophene open. Using this opportunity, King Artaxias attempted to take over the kingdom and unite Sophene with Armenia, however Artaxias's brother, Mithrobouzanes, (Known in Armenian as Meruzhan, Մերուժան) ascended to the throne, thus causing conflict. Mithrobouzanes would flee Sophene to Cappadocia, and requested Ariarathes V to send aid, which he agreed. The Cappadocian army pushed Artaxias's army out of Sophene and reinstalled Mithrobouzanes on the throne.

The Death of Satenik's Father and Usurpation 
After the death of Satenik's father, a usurper took over the Alanian kingdom, and Satenik's brother requested Artaxias's aid. Upon the order of King Artaxias, Smbat swiftly put the usurper to flight and reinstalled Satenik's brother on the throne. The prisoners captured after the battle were resettled to the region of Artaz, which was renamed to Shavarshan but kept its original name. The Araveleank royal house claims be the descendants of the Alans and related to Satenik.

Caspian Rebellion 
Khorenatsi also writes about a revolt by the Caspians, which was first started off by disobedience by the Gelae in the region of Patizhahar, which later was joined by the Caspians, who in turn began to rebel. Thus King Artaxias sent Smbat, and the entire Armenian army, to deal with the revolt. Artaxias joined Smbat for seven days, subduing the revolt and capturing the king, Zardmanos. As a reward for his service, Artaxias granted the royal portion of the villages of Goghtan to Smbat, as well as the springs of Ught and the spoils gained.

Smbat's Departure 
Artavasdes became jealous of Smbat's gains, and began plotting for his murder, However both King Artaxias and Smbat found out of the plot. Disturbed, Smbat willfully abandoned his post and left for Corduene, and settled in the region of Tmorik and married an Assyrian wife. In the absence of Smbat, King Artaxias granted Artavasdes the command of the entire army, while also assigning his sons various other positions. Seeking to avenge the wrong doings that have been done against Smbat, Mazhan requested King Artaxias to strip Artavasdes and Tigranes's positions in the Armenian army, and instead entrust Zariadres with the army. However King Artaxias denied his request, and Mazhan began plotting against Tigranes. Upon finding out, Artavasdes and Tigranes ambushed and killed Mazhan during a hunt, and buried him at Bagavan as chief priest. The Vahevunis would take over the position as chief priest.

Seleucid and Iberian Invasion 
In 165/4 BC, Antiochus IV Epiphanes invaded Armenia, pushing back Tigranes's western army to the region of Basen. The Iberians, aided by Alans, using this opportunity, also began raiding Armenia. According to Appian, King Artaxias was captured during this invasion, however details regarding his capture aren't specified. Artavasdes, Smbat, and his brothers hastened to oppose Antiochus IV's forces, while Zariadres was sent to Javakhk to repel the Iberians. The Seleucids would be defeated, and were forced to retreat due to internal troubles at home. However, in Javakhk, Zareh lost the battle and was captured by the Iberians. Three years later, Smbat, Artavasdes, and Tigranes brought their armies to Trialeti, however negotiated with the Iberians to return Zariadres, in exchange for an alliance with Armenia, as well as the ceding of the regions of Javakhk and Ardahan, the town of Tsunda, and the fortress of Demotistsikhe to the Iberians. In 161/0 BC, Artaxias managed to aid the satrap of Media, Timarchus, who rebelled against Seleucid rule. Artaxias most likely used this opportunity to return to Armenia.

Death and Funeral 
King Artaxias would fall ill in 160 BC at the town of Bakurakert, located in the region of Marand. He sent Abeghoy, the head of the Abeghean family to the temple of Anahit located in Yekegheats to seek healing and long life from the gods. However, King Artaxias passed away prior to Abeghoy's return. Khorenatsi wrote that many would commit suicide in hearing the news of the King's death. It was said that he was placed in a gold coffin, with silk bier and litter, gold threaded robes, and his crown. His body was surrounded by his sons and his friends, as well as the military. Eventually the public joined and King Artaxias was buried.

Folktale 
Khorenatsi writes about a folktale that the minstrels of Goghtan sung about, that King Artaxias curses Artavasdes for his jealousy. Saying that if Artavasdes was to go hunting near Mt. Masis, the Kaj would capture him and imprison him in the mountain. Eventually, Artavasdes would go hunting near Masis and get captured by the Kaj and would be chained in a cave. It was also said that two Aralezs would try to break the chains, but the Kaj would continue to strengthen the chain.

Coinage 
Unlike their predecessors, the Orontids, the majority of the Artaxiad rulers minted coins. The first coins depicting Artaxias bore the Aramaic inscription "King Artashes" (Aramaic:𐡀𐡓𐡕𐡇𐡔𐡎𐡉 𐡌𐡋𐡊𐡀, romanized: 'rthṣsy mlk) and have depicted of the Armenian wolfhound or Gampr, a Bee, the head of an unknown bearded male, eagle, and the head of Antiochus IV. Later coinage would drop the use of Aramaic and transition to Greek inscriptions (Ancient Greek: ΒΑΣΙΛΕΩΣ ΑΡΤΑΞΕΡΞΟΥ, romanized: Basileus Artakserksou). These coins would also depict the Cornucopia, Grapes, and Club on the reverses. Artaxias is always depicted as bearded and wearing his five peaked Armenian tiara, with the exception of one coin depicting him wearing a Phrygian cap with a fanion and lappets.

References

Notes

Citations

Sources

External links
 Coinage of Artaxias I
 Coinage of Artaxias I
 Coinage of Artaxias I

2nd-century BC kings of Armenia
2nd-century BC rulers
Artaxiad dynasty
160 BC deaths
2nd-century BC births
2nd-century BC Iranian people